Wash Day Diaries is a young adult graphic novel written by Jamila Rowser and Robyn Smith that follows four young Black women in New York. The book was published by Chronicle Books in 2022.

Plot 
This book follows four young African American women. The main characters are close friends, Kim, Tanisha, Davene, and Cookie. Kim is arguably the main character of this story. This book is written in the graphic novel genre. The authors wanted to have the plot around an important aspect of African American culture. The graphic novel is in a five short story format. Each chapter of this book shares parts of each character's life and what is going on for them socially and mentally. One of the main characters is in a love triangle and during wash day they all discuss the challenge of trying to choose between two possible boys to date. The authors take care to acknowledge and portray the Black sisterhood between the four girls. The experiences told by the authors are deeply personal experiences with Black hair care. The main characters form a self-care regimen during multiple hours-long hair appointments. The authors brought this story to life with colorful illustrations throughout the graphic novel.

Characters 
This book follows four young women in New York, Kim, Tanisha, Davene, and Cookie.

Development History 
The authors of Wash Day Diaries, Jamila Rowser and Robyn Smith wanted to depict the importance of Black hair in African American culture. They wanted a relatable age for a wide range of readers as well as a story that would be interesting to all readers. The authors wanted to discuss aspects African American hair culture like, “wash day”. Hair is a large part of African American culture, washing their hair and styling it takes long amounts of time and is often a quality time in families and communities.

Reception 
Wash Day Dairies received significant attention when it was released in 2021. This book has received several awards, including: 

 2023 Alex Award Winner from YASLA/ALA.
 NYPL's Best Books of 2022 List.
 Starred review from Publisher's Weekly.
 Winner of the 2023 Booklist from Rise: A Feminist Book Project.
 Best Queer Books of 2022 | Autostraddle.

Influence 
The main influence of this graphic novel was Black hair culture within African American culture.

Themes 
The large theme throughout this book is Black hair culture. The story follows four young women's journeys of finding their place within African American hair culture. Throughout the last few decades controversy around and discrimination against African American people in regard to their hair has evolved but not gone away. An article from the ADL (Anti-Defamation League) discusses some of the current discrimination against Black hair. The ADL highlights the CROWN Act “Create a Respectful and Open Workplace for Natural Hair,” and the steps it is taking to combat hair discrimination.

Authors 
Jamila Rowser writes young adult books about embracing African American culture. She wrote Wash Day Diaries, and Wobbledy 3000. Rowser is a Queer Black, Puerto Rican, and Dominican award-winning comics writer, editor, and publisher. Rowser lives in Miami and has spent time living in the Bronx, New Yok. 

Robyn Smith had contributed to many young adult graphic novels including, Wash Day Diaries, Nubia: Real One, Chemical Process Design and Integration, The Saddest Angriest Black Girl in Town, Horse Life: The Ultimate Guide to Caring for and Riding Horses for Kids, and The Big Activity Book for Couples. Smith is a Jamaican cartoonist and graphic novel artist from New York.

Publisher 
Wash Day Diaries was published in 2022 by Chronicle Books. Chronicle Books has other books that are also about African American culture in the young adult genre. Living While Black by Ajuan Mance and Alicia Garza was published in 2022. The New Black West by Gabriela Hasbun was published in 2022. My Beautiful Black Hair:101 Natural Hair Stories from the Sisterhood by St. Clair Detrick and Alexandra Elle was published in 2021. Black Icons in Herstory: 50 Legendary Women by Monica Ahanonu and Darian Symon was published in 2022.

References

Graphic novels